The 2013–14 New Jersey Devils season was the 40th season for the National Hockey League franchise that was established on June 11, 1974, and 32nd season since the franchise relocated from Colorado prior to the 1982–83 NHL season. For the second-straight season, the Devils failed to make the playoffs.

Regular season

Stadium Series 
The Devils played their cross-town rivals, the New York Rangers, at the 2014 NHL Stadium Series at Yankee Stadium in The Bronx, New York City, on January 26, 2014. This was the first stadium series game ever played in the NHL's history. It was also the first time that the Devils played an outdoor game. The Devils lost the game 7–3 after giving up a 3–2 lead in the first period.

Standings

Schedule and results

Pre-season

Regular season

Media
This season was Chico Resch's final season as a television color commentator on MSG Plus. Former studio commentator Ken Daneyko would take his place the following season. Steve Cangialosi would remain as TV play-by-play announcer. Matt Loughlin and Sherry Ross did radio commenting as usual.

Player statistics
Final stats
Skaters

Goaltenders

†Denotes player spent time with another team before joining the Devils. Stats reflect time with the Devils only.
‡Denotes player was traded mid-season.  Stats reflect time with the Devils only.
Bold/italics denotes franchise record.

Transactions 
The Devils have been involved in the following transactions during the 2013–14 season.

Trades

|}

Free agents acquired

Free agents lost

Claimed via waivers

Lost via waivers

Lost via retirement

Player signings

Draft picks

New Jersey Devils' picks at the 2013 NHL Entry Draft, which was held in Newark, New Jersey, on June 30, 2013.

Draft notes

 The New Jersey Devils' first-round pick went to the Vancouver Canucks as the result of a June 30, 2013, trade that sent Cory Schneider to the Devils in exchange for this pick.
 The New Jersey Devils' second-round pick went to the Phoenix Coyotes as the result of a June 30, 2013, trade that sent a 2013 second-round pick (#42–Steve Santini) and a 2013 third-round pick (#73–Ryan Kujawinski) to the Devils in exchange for this pick.
 The Phoenix Coyotes' second-round pick went to the New Jersey Devils as a result of a June 30, 2013, trade that sent a 2013 second-round pick (#39–Laurent Dauphin) to the Coyotes in exchange for a 2013 third-round pick (#73–Ryan Kujawinski) and this pick.
 The New Jersey Devils' third-round pick went to the Minnesota Wild as the result of a February 24, 2012, trade that sent Marek Zidlicky to the Devils in exchange for Kurtis Foster, Nick Palmieri, Stephane Veilleux, a 2012 second-round pick (#46–Raphael Bussier) and this pick.
 The Phoenix Coyotes' third-round pick went to the New Jersey Devils as a result of a June 30, 2013, trade that sent a 2013 second-round pick (#39–Laurent Dauphin) to the Coyotes in exchange for a 2013 second-round pick (#42–Steve Santini) and this pick.
 The New Jersey Devils' fifth-round pick went to the Buffalo Sabres (via Los Angeles and Florida), New Jersey traded this pick to the Los Angeles Kings as the result of a February 6, 2013, trade that sent Andrei Loktionov to the Devils in exchange for this pick.
 The New Jersey Devils' seventh-round pick went to the Winnipeg Jets as the result of a February 13, 2013, trade that sent Alexei Ponikarovsky to the Devils in exchange for a 2014 fourth-round pick and this pick.
 The Los Angeles Kings' seventh-round pick went to the New Jersey Devils as a result of a June 30, 2013, trade that sent a 2015 seventh-round pick to the Kings in exchange for this pick.

References

New Jersey Devils seasons
New Jersey Devils
New Jersey Devils
New Jersey Devils
New Jersey Devils
21st century in Newark, New Jersey